The 1969–70 Philadelphia Flyers season was the Philadelphia Flyers' third season in the National Hockey League (NHL). The Flyers missed the playoffs for the first time in franchise history, setting a team record for fewest wins and an NHL record for most ties.

Off-season
On May 20, 1969, Keith Allen was named vice president and assistant general manager of the team and replaced as head coach by Vic Stasiuk. Stasiuk spent the previous two seasons as the head coach of the Quebec Aces, the Flyers American Hockey League affiliate.

The Flyers took a chance when they selected a 19-year-old diabetic from Flin Flon, Manitoba, named Bobby Clarke with their second draft pick, 17th overall, in the 1969 NHL Amateur Draft.

Regular season
By the time training camp came around it was clear that Clarke was the best player on the team, and he quickly became a fan favorite. His 15 goals and 31 assists  earned him a trip to the NHL All-Star Game.

On December 11, 1969, the Flyers introduced what became one of the team's best-known traditions: playing a recording of Kate Smith singing God Bless America instead of The Star-Spangled Banner before important games. The perception was that the team was more successful on these occasions, so the tradition grew. The move was initially done by Flyers promotion director Lou Scheinfeld as a way to defray national tensions at the time of the Vietnam War: Scheinfeld noticed that people regularly left their seats to walk around during the anthem, but showed more respect and often sang along to "God Bless America". To this day, the team plays the song before major playoff games, currently with Lauren Hart (daughter of Hall of Fame Flyers broadcast announcer Gene Hart) performing the first part of the song, a recording of Smith singing the second part, and Lauren Hart joining the recording for the finale. As of the close of the 2013–14 Flyers season, the Flyers have a record of 96–28–4 when God Bless America is sung prior to home games.

General manager Bud Poile was fired on December 19. Keith Allen was named his replacement on December 22.

The team struggled in 1969–70 recording a franchise worst (as of completion of the 2013–14 season) in wins (17). Even with such a bad output, the Flyers had a seven-point lead on the Oakland Seals with six games to play. However, the Flyers lost their last six games and Oakland made up the deficit. They lost the tiebreaker for the final playoff spot to Oakland, missing the playoffs for the first time.

Season standings

Schedule and results

Regular season

|- style="background:#fcf;"
| 1 || October 11 || @ Minnesota North Stars || 0–4 || 0–1–0 || 0 || 
|- style="background:#ffc;"
| 2 || October 15 || @ Pittsburgh Penguins || 3–3 || 0–1–1 || 1 || 
|- style="background:#ffc;"
| 3 || October 19 || Montreal Canadiens || 1–1 || 0–1–2 || 2 || 
|- style="background:#cfc;"
| 4 || October 22 || @ Toronto Maple Leafs || 4–3 || 1–1–2 || 4 || 
|- style="background:#ffc;"
| 5 || October 23 || Detroit Red Wings || 2–2 || 1–1–3 || 5 || 
|- style="background:#ffc;"
| 6 || October 26 || St. Louis Blues || 0–0 || 1–1–4 || 6 || 
|- style="background:#ffc;"
| 7 || October 30 || New York Rangers || 3–3 || 1–1–5 || 7 || 
|-

|- style="background:#fcf;"
| 8 || November 1 || @ St. Louis Blues || 0–8 || 1–2–5 || 7 || 
|- style="background:#cfc;"
| 9 || November 2 || Minnesota North Stars || 6–2 || 2–2–5 || 9 || 
|- style="background:#fcf;"
| 10 || November 6 || Montreal Canadiens || 1–4 || 2–3–5 || 9 || 
|- style="background:#ffc;"
| 11 || November 9 || Oakland Seals || 2–2 || 2–3–6 || 10 || 
|- style="background:#fcf;"
| 12 || November 12 || @ Minnesota North Stars || 2–4 || 2–4–6 || 10 || 
|- style="background:#fcf;"
| 13 || November 15 || @ Toronto Maple Leafs || 2–4 || 2–5–6 || 10 || 
|- style="background:#cfc;"
| 14 || November 20 || Los Angeles Kings || 3–2 || 3–5–6 || 12 || 
|- style="background:#fcf;"
| 15 || November 22 || @ Pittsburgh Penguins || 3–5 || 3–6–6 || 12 || 
|- style="background:#fcf;"
| 16 || November 23 || Toronto Maple Leafs || 2–3 || 3–7–6 || 12 || 
|- style="background:#ffc;"
| 17 || November 26 || Detroit Red Wings || 1–1 || 3–7–7 || 13 || 
|- style="background:#fcf;"
| 18 || November 27 || @ Boston Bruins || 4–6 || 3–8–7 || 13 || 
|- style="background:#ffc;"
| 19 || November 29 || @ New York Rangers || 2–2 || 3–8–8 || 14 || 
|- style="background:#ffc;"
| 20 || November 30 || Pittsburgh Penguins || 3–3 || 3–8–9 || 15 || 
|-

|- style="background:#cfc;"
| 21 || December 3 || @ Los Angeles Kings || 7–1 || 4–8–9 || 17 || 
|- style="background:#ffc;"
| 22 || December 5 || @ Oakland Seals || 2–2 || 4–8–10 || 18 || 
|- style="background:#fcf;"
| 23 || December 7 || St. Louis Blues || 1–4 || 4–9–10 || 18 || 
|- style="background:#cfc;"
| 24 || December 11 || Toronto Maple Leafs || 6–3 || 5–9–10 || 20 || 
|- style="background:#fcf;"
| 25 || December 13 || Boston Bruins || 3–5 || 5–10–10 || 20 || 
|- style="background:#fcf;"
| 26 || December 14 || @ Chicago Black Hawks || 1–4 || 5–11–10 || 20 || 
|- style="background:#ffc;"
| 27 || December 17 || @ New York Rangers || 2–2 || 5–11–11 || 21 || 
|- style="background:#fcf;"
| 28 || December 20 || @ St. Louis Blues || 0–3 || 5–12–11 || 21 || 
|- style="background:#cfc;"
| 29 || December 21 || Pittsburgh Penguins || 4–0 || 6–12–11 || 23 || 
|- style="background:#cfc;"
| 30 || December 25 || Oakland Seals || 3–1 || 7–12–11 || 25 || 
|- style="background:#ffc;"
| 31 || December 27 || @ Montreal Canadiens || 2–2 || 7–12–12 || 26 || 
|- style="background:#fcf;"
| 32 || December 28 || Boston Bruins || 4–5 || 7–13–12 || 26 || 
|-

|- style="background:#fcf;"
| 33 || January 1 || @ Los Angeles Kings || 3–4 || 7–14–12 || 26 || 
|- style="background:#fcf;"
| 34 || January 3 || Detroit Red Wings || 1–6 || 7–15–12 || 26 || 
|- style="background:#cfc;"
| 35 || January 4 || Minnesota North Stars || 3–1 || 8–15–12 || 28 || 
|- style="background:#ffc;"
| 36 || January 7 || @ St. Louis Blues || 2–2 || 8–15–13 || 29 || 
|- style="background:#cfc;"
| 37 || January 8 || Los Angeles Kings || 4–1 || 9–15–13 || 31 || 
|- style="background:#ffc;"
| 38 || January 10 || Oakland Seals || 2–2 || 9–15–14 || 32 || 
|- style="background:#cfc;"
| 39 || January 13 || @ Oakland Seals || 3–1 || 10–15–14 || 34 || 
|- style="background:#ffc;"
| 40 || January 15 || New York Rangers || 4–4 || 10–15–15 || 35 || 
|- style="background:#fcf;"
| 41 || January 17 || @ Detroit Red Wings || 3–5 || 10–16–15 || 35 || 
|- style="background:#fcf;"
| 42 || January 18 || Pittsburgh Penguins || 4–6 || 10–17–15 || 35 || 
|- style="background:#ffc;"
| 43 || January 22 || @ Boston Bruins || 3–3 || 10–17–16 || 36 || 
|- style="background:#cfc;"
| 44 || January 24 || @ Minnesota North Stars || 6–0 || 11–17–16 || 38 || 
|- style="background:#cfc;"
| 45 || January 25 || St. Louis Blues || 2–0 || 12–17–16 || 40 || 
|- style="background:#ffc;"
| 46 || January 28 || @ Chicago Black Hawks || 2–2 || 12–17–17 || 41 || 
|- style="background:#fcf;"
| 47 || January 29 || @ Detroit Red Wings || 3–4 || 12–18–17 || 41 || 
|- style="background:#fcf;"
| 48 || January 31 || Chicago Black Hawks || 0–5 || 12–19–17 || 41 || 
|-

|- style="background:#fcf;"
| 49 || February 1 || Montreal Canadiens || 2–5 || 12–20–17 || 41 || 
|- style="background:#fcf;"
| 50 || February 5 || @ Boston Bruins || 1–5 || 12–21–17 || 41 || 
|- style="background:#ffc;"
| 51 || February 7 || @ Chicago Black Hawks || 4–4 || 12–21–18 || 42 || 
|- style="background:#cfc;"
| 52 || February 8 || @ Detroit Red Wings || 5–3 || 13–21–18 || 44 || 
|- style="background:#ffc;"
| 53 || February 12 || Toronto Maple Leafs || 3–3 || 13–21–19 || 45 || 
|- style="background:#fcf;"
| 54 || February 14 || @ Toronto Maple Leafs || 3–4 || 13–22–19 || 45 || 
|- style="background:#cfc;"
| 55 || February 15 || Los Angeles Kings || 7–1 || 14–22–19 || 47 || 
|- style="background:#fcf;"
| 56 || February 17 || @ Pittsburgh Penguins || 2–4 || 14–23–19 || 47 || 
|- style="background:#ffc;"
| 57 || February 18 || @ New York Rangers || 3–3 || 14–23–20 || 48 || 
|- style="background:#fcf;"
| 58 || February 21 || @ Montreal Canadiens || 3–5 || 14–24–20 || 48 || 
|- style="background:#fcf;"
| 59 || February 26 || Chicago Black Hawks || 2–3 || 14–25–20 || 48 || 
|- style="background:#cfc;"
| 60 || February 28 || Minnesota North Stars || 6–2 || 15–25–20 || 50 || 
|-

|- style="background:#ffc;"
| 61 || March 1 || Los Angeles Kings || 4–4 || 15–25–21 || 51 || 
|- style="background:#ffc;"
| 62 || March 4 || @ Minnesota North Stars || 2–2 || 15–25–22 || 52 || 
|- style="background:#ffc;"
| 63 || March 7 || Boston Bruins || 5–5 || 15–25–23 || 53 || 
|- style="background:#fcf;"
| 64 || March 8 || Chicago Black Hawks || 2–3 || 15–26–23 || 53 || 
|- style="background:#fcf;"
| 65 || March 12 || @ St. Louis Blues || 2–4 || 15–27–23 || 53 || 
|- style="background:#cfc;"
| 66 || March 14 || @ Los Angeles Kings || 5–3 || 16–27–23 || 55 || 
|- style="background:#fcf;"
| 67 || March 15 || @ Oakland Seals || 1–2 || 16–28–23 || 55 || 
|- style="background:#ffc;"
| 68 || March 19 || New York Rangers || 2–2 || 16–28–24 || 56 || 
|- style="background:#fcf;"
| 69 || March 21 || @ Montreal Canadiens || 0–2 || 16–29–24 || 56 || 
|- style="background:#cfc;"
| 70 || March 22 || Oakland Seals || 3–2 || 17–29–24 || 58 || 
|- style="background:#fcf;"
| 71 || March 25 || @ Oakland Seals || 2–3 || 17–30–24 || 58 || 
|- style="background:#fcf;"
| 72 || March 26 || @ Los Angeles Kings || 2–3 || 17–31–24 || 58 || 
|- style="background:#fcf;"
| 73 || March 28 || Pittsburgh Penguins || 1–2 || 17–32–24 || 58 || 
|-

|- style="background:#fcf;"
| 74 || April 1 || @ Pittsburgh Penguins || 1–4 || 17–33–24 || 58 || 
|- style="background:#fcf;"
| 75 || April 2 || St. Louis Blues || 0–1 || 17–34–24 || 58 || 
|- style="background:#fcf;"
| 76 || April 4 || Minnesota North Stars || 0–1 || 17–35–24 || 58 || 
|-

|-
| Legend:

Player statistics

Scoring
 Position abbreviations: C = Center; D = Defense; G = Goaltender; LW = Left Wing; RW = Right Wing

Goaltending

Awards and records

Awards

Records

During the 1969–70 season, the Flyers set the NHL record for most ties in a season with 24. They also tied an NHL record for most home ties with 13. Their four consecutive ties at home from October 19 to October 30 set a team record. Their 17 wins on the season is the lowest total in franchise history while their six home wins on the season tied the mark set during the 1968–69 season. Goaltender Bernie Parent set franchise records for most losses (29, later tied by Antero Niittymaki during the 2006–07 season) and most ties (20).

Transactions
The Flyers were involved in the following transactions from May 5, 1969, the day after the deciding game of the 1969 Stanley Cup Finals, through May 10, 1970, the day of the deciding game of the 1970 Stanley Cup Finals.

Trades

Players acquired

Players lost

Signings

Draft picks

Philadelphia's picks at the 1969 NHL Amateur Draft, which was held at the Queen Elizabeth Hotel in Montreal, Quebec, on June 11, 1969. During the draft, the Flyers traded their seventh-round pick, 75th overall, to the Montreal Canadiens in order to re-acquire Jean-Guy Gendron, who Montreal had selected from the Flyers earlier in the day during the Inter-League Draft.

Farm teams
The Flyers were affiliated with the Quebec Aces of the AHL, the Flint Generals of the IHL, and the Jersey Devils of the EHL.

Notes

References
General
 
 
 
Specific

Philadelphia
Philadelphia
Philadelphia Flyers seasons
Philad
Philad